The North American 3 Hockey League (NA3HL) is an American Tier III junior ice hockey league that consists of teams from Connecticut, Georgia, Illinois, Iowa, Louisiana, Massachusetts, Minnesota, Missouri, Montana, New Jersey, New Mexico, New York, Oklahoma, South Dakota, Texas, Wisconsin, and Wyoming. Sanctioned by USA Hockey, for most of the league's existence, the winner of the NA3HL playoffs would advance to play for the Tier III National Championship, however, this has not been held since 2015.

History
Originally formed in the early 1970s as a Junior B-level league known as the Central States Hockey League (CSHL), the league evolved into the Metro Detroit Junior Hockey League in the early 1980s. The CSHL name  was used again from 1994 until 2010. The league was reclassified from Tier III Junior B to Tier III Junior A in the summer of 2007 by USA Hockey.

During the 2008–09 season, it was announced that the Pittsburgh Jr. Penguins would join the CSHL for the 2009–10 season, bringing the number of teams to 13. The league returned to 12 teams for 2010–11, as the Dubuque Thunderbirds franchise folded to make way for the return of the Dubuque Fighting Saints in the United States Hockey League.

On November 1, 2010, it was announced that the North American Hockey League would take control of the CSHL. The NAHL-CSHL affiliation intends for a more structured junior hockey system to provide athletes with more opportunities to advance to college and professional hockey, including a draft of CSHL players into the NAHL. At the time of the take over, the league was renamed to the North American 3 Hockey League (NA3HL).

In May 2011, it was announced that the Granite City Lumberjacks, Minnesota Flying Aces, North Iowa Bulls and the Twin City Steel would join the league beginning with the 2011–12 season bringing the total number of teams in the NA3HL to 16.

In March 2013, the NA3HL announced that its Board of Governors has accepted the membership application for the Chicago Jr. Bulldogs, which began play in the NA3HL during the 2013–14 season. Owned by Ken Kestas, the Bulldogs played home games out of Canlan Ice Sports in Romeoville, Illinois.

Quad City Jr. Flames (Davenport, Iowa) relocated to Madison, Wisconsin, in May 2013 and were renamed the Wisconsin Whalers.

In May 2014, the Flint Jr. Generals were purchased and relocated to La Crosse, Wisconsin, and renamed the La Crosse Freeze. The NA3HL announced that the Texas Jr. Brahmas would transfer from the Western States Hockey League and join the South Division. The expansion Nashville Junior Predators and Point Mallard Ducks (Decatur, AL) also joined the South Division bringing its total up to six teams. The American West Hockey League moved to the NA3HL to form new Frontier Division. The Battle Creek Revolution announced it was re-branding as the West Michigan Wolves. The Michigan Mountain Cats were sold and relocated to Jamestown, NY, and called the Southern Tier Xpress.

In April 2015, the NA3HL announced an expansion team in Evansville, Indiana, called the Thunderbolts, to play in the South Division beginning in the 2015–16 season. On May 21–22 of 2015, two additional expansion teams were announced: Rochester Ice Hawks, a member of the former Minnesota Junior Hockey League, was added the West Division, and the Louisiana Drillers playing out of Lafayette, Louisiana was added to the South Division.

On March 4, 2016, it was formally announced that the North American Hockey League's other Tier III league, the North American 3 Eastern Hockey League (NA3EHL), would be added to the NA3HL beginning with the 2016–17 season. The former NA3EHL teams became two new divisions within the NA3HL. On May 21, 2016, the Missoula Bruins youth hockey organization from Missoula, Montana, announced it had been approved as an expansion team in the Frontier Division of the NA3HL. The Missoula Junior Bruins replaced the Missoula Maulers of the Western States Hockey League after arena negotiations with the Maulers' owner fell through.

Prior to the 2017–18 season, the Lockport Express relocated to become the Niagara Falls PowerHawks, the Syracuse Stampede relocated to become the Oswego Stampede, and the West Michigan Wolves relocated to become the Lansing Wolves. The Chicago Jr. Bulldogs, Euless Jr. Stars, and L/A Fighting Spirit franchises were sold; the Bulldogs were relocated as the Wausau RiverWolves, the Jr. Stars re-branded as the Mid-Cities Jr. Stars, and the Fighting Spirit re-branded as the Lewiston/Auburn Nordiques. The Cincinnati Thunder, which had already been playing out of Dayton, re-branded as the Dayton Falcons. The Butte Cobras, formerly of the Western States Hockey League (WSHL), purchased the Glacier Nationals franchise in order to join the NA3HL. The schedule was set with 47 teams, however, the Butte Cobras and Billings Bulls would both fold prior to playing a game, while the Dayton Falcons, Nashville Junior Predators, and Jersey Shore Wildcats were also removed from the schedules during the season.

In April 2018, the NA3HL announced the entire East Division had left the league including the reigning champions, the Metro Jets, and joined the United States Premier Hockey League (USPHL). The Butte Cobras were also announced as returning and the Point Mallard Ducks were purchased and relocated to become the Milwaukee Power.

In 2020, the WSHL's Oklahoma City Jr. Blazers purchased the dormant Coulee Region Chill franchise to join the league for 2020 and the El Paso Rhinos announced an agreement to add expansion teams to both the NA3HL in 2020 and the NAHL in 2021. The Coastal and Northeast divisions merged into a new East Division beginning with the 2020–21 season following several teams withdrawing.

Alumni
Many prominent college and pro hockey players have played in the CSHL at one point in their careers, including 2007 Hobey Baker finalist Eric Ehn (Metro Jets), St. Louis Blues forward and 2010 and 2014 U.S. Olympian Paul Stastny (St. Louis Jr. Blues) and Chris Butler (St. Louis Jr. Blues), now in the St. Louis Blues' organization.

Teams

Champions
The league championship trophy is the Fraser Cup. It was originally called the Hurster Cup during the league's time as the Central States Hockey League. In 2012, the cup was then renamed to the Silver Cup. In 2017, the league again renamed the championship to the Fraser Cup after long-time NAHL, NA3HL, and NAPHL Director of Hockey Administration, Robert ‘Fraser’ Ritchie. The winner of the Cup typically receives a bid to compete in the USA Hockey Tier III junior hockey National Championship Tournament, however, the tournament has not been held since 2015.

Former teams
Battle Creek Jr. Revolution (Battle Creek, Michigan; 2010–2014). Joined as an expansion team in 2010 after initially planning on joining the Northern Junior Hockey League. Renamed West Michigan Wolves in 2014.
Billings Bulls (Billings, Montana; 2014–2017). Joined from the American West Hockey League; ceased operations at the start of the 2017–18 season due to lack of players.
Binghamton Jr. Senators (Binghamton, New York; 2016–2019) Relocated after the 2018–19 season as the Elmira Jr. Soaring Eagles.
Breezy Point North Stars (Breezy Point, Minnesota; 2012–2020). Not listed as a member after the 2019–20 season. Sold and reactivated as the Minnesota Loons in 2021.
Butte Cobras (Butte, Montana). Organization joined from the Western States Hockey League after purchasing the Glacier Nationals NA3HL franchise in 2017. The Cobras failed to play a game and ceased operations during the opening weekend of the 2017–18 season due to lack of players. Returned to the NA3HL for the 2018–19 season.
Cape Cod Islanders (Falmouth, Massachusetts; 2016–2019) Franchise joined from the NA3EHL in 2016. Relocated as the Canton Cubs after the 2018–19 season but were removed from the league before playing in Canton.
Chicago Force (Rolling Meadows, Illinois; 2004–2010). Organization obtained a Tier II North American Hockey League franchise and named it the Chicago Hitmen. The organization would also rename its Tier III CSHL franchise to match.
Chicago Hitmen (Rolling Meadows, Illinois; 2010–2012). Organization ceased operations of both their Tier II and Tier III franchises prior to the 2012–13 season.
Chicago Jr. Bulldogs (Romeoville, Illinois; 2013–2017). Franchise was sold and re-located to Wausau, Wisconsin, as the Wausau RiverWolves following the 2016–17 season.
Cincinnati Cobras (Cincinnati, Ohio; 1999–2006). Renamed Cincinnati Jr. Cyclones.
Cincinnati Jr. Cyclones (Cincinnati, Ohio; 2006–2007). Folded and replaced by Queen City Steam.
Cincinnati Swords (Cincinnati, Ohio; 2013–2015). Renamed Cincinnati Thunder in 2015.
Cincinnati Thunder (Cincinnati, Ohio, for 2015–16; Centerville, Ohio, for 2016–17). Renamed to Dayton Falcons when the team remained in the Dayton suburb of Centerville instead of returning to Cincinnati after the 2016–17 season.
Cleveland Jr. Lumberjacks (Strongsville, Ohio; 2004–2015). Franchise purchased by the Wooster Oilers.
College Station Spirit (College Station, Texas; 2016–2019). Became Texas RoadRunners.
Columbus Crush (Columbus, Ohio; 1998–2003). Became Columbus Stars.
Columbus Jr. "B" Blue Jackets (Columbus, Ohio; 2004–2007)
Columbus Stars (Columbus, Ohio; 2003–2004). Became Jr. "B" Blue Jackets.
 Coulee Region Chill (La Crosse, Wisconsin; 2014–2020). Relocated to La Crosse as the Freeze in 2014; rebranded in 2018 taking its name from the former Coulee Region Chill of the NAHL; arena was closed and the team withdrew from NA3HL after the 2019–20 season. Franchise sold to the Oklahoma City Jr. Blazers, formerly of the Western States Hockey League, prior to the 2020–21 season.
Danbury Colonials (Danbury, Connecticut; 2019–2020). Rebranded to Danbury Jr. Hat Tricks when the organization added an NAHL team in 2020 to match the professional team, the Danbury Hat Tricks.
Dayton Falcons (Centerville, Ohio; 2017). Folded after 12 games into the 2017–18 season.
Dubuque Thunderbirds (Dubuque, Iowa; 2006–2010). Joined from the Minnesota Junior Hockey League. Ceased operations after they were replaced by a Tier I United States Hockey League team, the Dubuque Fighting Saints.
East Coast Minutemen (Salem, New Hampshire; 2016–2017). Franchise joined from the NA3EHL in 2016; folded in 2017.
Dallas Jr. Stars (Euless, Texas; 2013–2015). Renamed to Euless Junior Stars in 2015 by new owners.
Elmira Jr. Soaring Eagles (Horseheads, New York; 2019–2020). Relocated after the 2019–20 season as the Bay State Bobcats.
Euless Junior Stars (Euless, Texas; 2015–2017). Renamed to Mid-Cities Junior Stars in 2017 by new owners.
Evansville Jr. Thunderbolts (Evansville, Indiana; 2015–2019). Franchise sold and re-activated as the Oregon Tradesmen in Oregon, Wisconsin, for the 2020–21 season.
Flint Jr. Generals (Clayton Township, Michigan; 1998–2014). Sold and relocated to La Crosse, Wisconsin, and became the La Crosse Freeze.
Glacier Nationals (Havre, Montana; 2014–2017). Joined from the American West Hockey League in 2014. Purchased and relocated to Butte, Montana, as the Butte Cobras, an organization that left the Western States Hockey League in 2017.
Grand Rapids Owls (Byron Center, Michigan; 1993–2010). Suspended operations prior to the start of the 2010–11 season.
Jersey Shore Wildcats (Wall Township, New Jersey; 2016–2017). Franchise joined from the NA3EHL in 2016; played the first 22 games into the 2017–18 season before being removed from the league.
L/A Fighting Spirit (Lewiston, Maine; 2016–2017). Franchise joined from the NA3EHL in 2016. Sold and renamed Lewiston/Auburn Nordiques after one season.
Lansing Wolves (Dimondale, Michigan; 2017–2018). Was previous known as the West Michigan Wolves. Left the NA3HL along with the entire East Division in 2018 to join the United States Premier Hockey League.
Lewiston/Auburn Nordiques (Lewiston, Maine; 2017–2020). Ceased operations after the 2019–20 season.
Lockport Express (Lockport, New York; 2016–2017). Franchise joined from the NA3EHL in 2016. Relocated to Niagara Falls, New York, as the Niagara Falls PowerHawks after one season in the NA3HL.
Maine Wild (Biddeford, Maine; 2016–2020). Franchise joined from the NA3EHL in 2016. Not listed as a member as of the 2020–21 season.
Metro Jets (Fraser, Michigan; 1989–2018). Left the NA3HL along with the entire East Division in 2018 after winning the league championship. Joined the United States Premier Hockey League.
Michigan Ice Dogs (Farmington Hills, Michigan; 2003–2008). Moved to the Great Lakes Junior Hockey League (2008–12), then the Midwest Junior Hockey League (2012–15), and then joined the USPHL-Midwest Division for 2015–16 as the Michigan Wild.
Michigan Mountain Cats (Farmington Hills, Michigan; 2010–2014). Franchise sold and relocated to Jamestown, New York, as the Southern Tier Xpress
Minnesota Flying Aces (Little Falls, Minnesota; 2011–2016). Joined from the Minnesota Junior Hockey League in 2011, franchise purchased and relocated to Willmar, Minnesota, in 2016.
Missoula Junior Bruins (Missoula, Montana; 2016–2021). Replaced the Missoula Maulers of the Western States Hockey League in 2016; sold franchise in 2021 and was relocated to Rapid City, South Dakota, as the Badlands Sabres.
Motor City Chiefs (Dearborn Heights, Michigan; 1985–2010). Franchise was sold and renamed Michigan Mountain Cats.
Nashville Junior Predators (Franklin, Tennessee; 2014–2017). Games cancelled at the end of October during the 2017–18 season; removed from the league one month later.
New England Knights (Raynham, Massachusetts; 2019–2020). After purchasing and relocating the Oswego Stampede franchise in 2019, the team was not listed as a member of the league for the 2020–21 season.
New England Stars (Tyngsboro, Massachusetts; 2016–2020). Franchise joined from the NA3EHL in 2016; franchise sold to the New Jersey Titans organization in 2020.
New York Aviators (Brooklyn/Brewster, New York). Franchise joined from the NA3EHL in 2016. Relocated to Long Beach, New York, to become the Long Beach Sharks after joining the NA3HL.
Niagara Falls PowerHawks (Niagara Falls, New York; 2017–2019) Relocated after the 2018–19 season as the Danbury Colonials.
North Iowa Bulls (Mason City, Iowa; 2011–2021). Organization purchased a North American Hockey League (NAHL) franchise and promoted the Bulls to the NAHL; the NA3HL team was then rebranded as the Mason City Toros.
Oklahoma City Jr. Blazers (Edmond, Oklahoma; 2020–2021). Joined from the Western States Hockey League by purchasing the franchise used by the Coulee Region Chill; played most of the season as the "Oklahoma City Hockey Club" and had removed most of its branding; renamed as Oklahoma City Ice Hawks in 2021.
Oklahoma City Ice Hawks (Edmond, Oklahoma; 2021–2022). Franchise was purchased by the New Mexico Ice Wolves NAHL team.
Oswego Stampede (Oswego, New York; 2017–2019). Franchise purchased and relocated to Raynham, Massachusetts, as the New England Knights.
Pittsburgh Jr. Penguins (Harmarville, Pennsylvania; 2009–2012). The Pittsburgh Jr. Penguins organization created a Junior A level team to compete in the CSHL in 2009. Renamed to Three Rivers Vengeance in 2012.
 Pittsburgh Vengeance (Harmarville, Pennsylvania; 2012–2018). Left with the entire East Division in 2018 to join the United States Premier Hockey League.
Point Mallard Ducks (Decatur, Alabama; 2014–2018). Expansion team for the 2014–15 season, sold and relocated as the Milwaukee Power.
Quad City Express (Davenport, Iowa; 2004–2007). Renamed Jr. Flames after the American Hockey League team, the Quad City Flames.
Quad City Jr. Flames (Davenport, Iowa; 2007–2013). Relocated to Madison, Wisconsin, and renamed to the Wisconsin Whalers.
Queen City Steam (Cincinnati, Ohio; 2007–2013) Renamed Cincinnati Swords after the merger of two youth hockey programs in the Cincinnati area.
Roc City Royals (Rochester, New York; 2016–2018). Team founded in 2014 in the North American 3 Eastern Hockey League and joined the NA3HL in 2016. Franchise was announced to be replaced by a team called the Rochester Riverman in 2018, but the Rivermen never played a game.
Rochester Ice Hawks (Rochester, Minnesota; 2015–2018). Joined from the Minnesota Junior Hockey League in 2015. The franchise was purchased and became the Rochester Grizzlies in 2018.
 Skylands Kings (Stockholm, New Jersey; 2016–2020). Joined from the NA3EHL in 2016; not listed as a member after the 2019–20 season. Franchise membership purchased by the Norwich Sea Captains organization to join the league in 2021.
 Southern Tier Xpress (Jamestown, New York; 2014–2018). Formerly the Michigan Mountain Cats, left the NA3HL along with the entire East Division in 2018 to join the United States Premier Hockey League. Never played in the USPHL because they were replaced in their arena by the Jamestown Rebels of the Tier II North American Hockey League.
 Sugar Land Imperials (Sugar Land, Texas; 2013–2016). An expansion team from 2013, the franchise was purchased and relocated to College Station, Texas, and renamed College Station Spirit in 2016.
Syracuse Stampede (Morrisville, New York; 2016–2017). Joined the NA3HL in 2016 from the NA3EHL. Relocated and rebranded to become the Oswego Stampede.
Three Rivers Vengeance (Harmarville, Pennsylvania; 2012–2013). Renamed Pittsburgh Vengeance after one season.
Toledo Cherokee (Toledo, Ohio; 1993–2018). Left the NA3HL along with the entire East Division in 2018 to join the United States Premier Hockey League.
Topeka Capitals (Topeka, Kansas; 2013–2015). Franchise relocated to Sandy Springs, Georgia, and renamed to Atlanta Capitals in 2015.
Twin City Steel (White Bear Lake, Minnesota; 2011–2016). Franchise relocated to New Ulm, Minnesota, and renamed New Ulm Steel in 2016.
Wausau RiverWolves (Wausau, Wisconsin; 2017–2021). Sold and renamed the Wausau Cyclones.
Wayne Wheels/Wheelers (Wayne, Michigan; 1998–2003). Renamed Michigan Ice Dogs.
West Michigan Wolves (Battle Creek, Michigan; 2014–2017). Relocated to the Dimondale, Michigan in the Lansing-area and renamed Lansing Wolves.
Wilkes-Barre/Scranton Miners (Wilkes-Barre, Pennsylvania). Franchise joined from the NA3EHL in 2016. Relocated to Binghamton, New York, to become the Binghamton Jr. Senators. after joining the NA3HL.
Wisconsin Whalers (Madison/Oregon, Wisconsin; 2013–2019). Franchise played in Madison from 2013 to 2015 before moving to Oregon, Wisconsin. Sold and relocated to Sheridan, Wyoming, as the Sheridan Hawks.
 Wooster Oilers (Wooster, Ohio; 2015–2018). Joined from the Minnesota Junior Hockey League in 2015. Left along with the entire East Division in 2018 to join the United States Premier Hockey League.

References

External links
 NA3HL official website

3
1970s establishments in the United States